Augusto Diego Lotti (born 10 June 1996) is an Argentine professional footballer who plays as a forward for Liga MX club Cruz Azul.

Career
Lotti, who is of Italian descent, began his youth career in Argentina with Cardenal Spínola between 2002 and 2004, before leaving for 12 de Octubre Olivos and subsequently Boca Juniors. He left the latter in December 2012, signing for Racing Club. In 2015, Lotti departed to Swiss football on loan by joining Challenge League side Wohlen. He featured in fifteen fixtures in the 2015–16 season, which included his senior bow on 8 November versus Biel-Bienne. His first goal came during a 2–2 draw with Neuchâtel Xamax in April 2016. Lotti stayed for 2016–17, netting against Le Mont, before returning to his homeland.

Back with Racing Club, he was on the bench for a Primera División fixture with Rosario Central in April 2018, which preceded his debut in the Copa Argentina versus Sarmiento in May. On 2 July 2018, Lotti was loaned to fellow Primera División side Unión Santa Fe. Sarmiento were again his debut opponents in the cup, with the forward being substituted on for the final minutes of a defeat to the Torneo Federal A team. After a brace against ex-club Boca Juniors in a friendly in January 2019, his first professional league appearance arrived on 23 January at the Estadio Monumental Antonio Vespucio Liberti against River Plate.

In March 2019, Lotti scored on his Copa Sudamericana bow versus Independiente del Valle; as Unión Santa Fe won 2–0.

Career statistics

References

External links

1996 births
Living people
Sportspeople from Buenos Aires Province
Argentine people of Italian descent
Argentine footballers
Association football forwards
Argentine expatriate footballers
Expatriate footballers in Switzerland
Argentine expatriate sportspeople in Switzerland
Swiss Challenge League players
Argentine Primera División players
Racing Club de Avellaneda footballers
FC Wohlen players
Unión de Santa Fe footballers
Atlético Tucumán footballers